Trinity is an unincorporated community in Wabash Township, Jay County, Indiana.

Trinity took its name from the Holy Trinity Catholic Church, established in 1861.

Geography

References

External links
Holy Trinity Church webpage
Land of the Cross Tipped Churches webpage
Interior of Holy Trinity Church
History of the Stallowstown Mission in Minster, Ohio

Unincorporated communities in Jay County, Indiana
Unincorporated communities in Indiana